The 5th constituency of Oise is a French legislative constituency in the Oise département.

Description

The 5th constituency of the Oise lies in the east of the department and includes the south of Compiègne.

The seat was held by conservative Lucien Degauchy from 1993 to 2017.

Historic Representation

Election results

2022 

 
 
 
 
|-
| colspan="8" bgcolor="#E9E9E9"|
|-

2017

2012

 
 
 
 
 
|-
| colspan="8" bgcolor="#E9E9E9"|
|-

Sources
Official results of French elections from 2002: "Résultats électoraux officiels en France" (in French).

5